Brachyrhaphis is a genus of poeciliids native to freshwater habitats in Central America. Most are restricted to Panama and Costa Rica, but B. holdridgei also occurs in Nicaragua and B. hartwegi is from Mexico and Guatemala. A recent phylogenetic analysis has suggested that Brachyrhaphis may not be of a monophyletic group.

Species
There are currently 12 recognized species in this genus:
 Brachyrhaphis cascajalensis (Meek & Hildebrand, 1913)
 Brachyrhaphis episcopi (Steindachner, 1878)
 Brachyrhaphis hartwegi D. E. Rosen & R. M. Bailey, 1963 (Soconusco gambusia)
 Brachyrhaphis hessfeldi M. K. Meyer & Etzel, 2001
 Brachyrhaphis holdridgei W. A. Bussing, 1967
 Brachyrhaphis olomina (Meek, 1914)
 Brachyrhaphis parismina (Meek, 1912)
 Brachyrhaphis punctifer (C. L. Hubbs, 1926)
 Brachyrhaphis rhabdophora (Regan, 1908)
 Brachyrhaphis roseni W. A. Bussing, 1988
 Brachyrhaphis roswithae M. K. Meyer & Etzel, 1998
 Brachyrhaphis terrabensis (Regan, 1907)

References

Poeciliidae
Fish of Central America
Freshwater fish genera
Taxa named by Charles Tate Regan
Ray-finned fish genera